Fernando Morena Belora (born 2 February 1952) is a Uruguayan former professional footballer who played as a striker. His most known nicknames were "Nando"(abridged form of Fernando) and "Potrillo" (Colt, although young stallion is a better translation in this case), and he is the all-time top goal scorer in the history of the Uruguayan Primera División with 230 goals in 244 games. He scored 268 in his almost 20-year career.

Club career

Fernando Morena started as a professional football player in 1968 with Racing Club de Montevideo, which he left in 1969, signing for the nearby team; River Plate from Montevideo where he played until 1972. Morena joined Peñarol in 1973, in his first run with the club he won four Uruguayan Primera championships. He was top scorer in the Uruguayan soccer league six consecutive years between 1973 and 1978, and was top scorer in the Copa Libertadores in 1974 and 1975.

In 1979 Fernando Morena signed up with the Spanish team Rayo Vallecano, but spent just one season there before changing to Valencia in 1980. Morena returned to Peñarol in 1981 where he helped the team win two more Uruguayan league titles in 1981 and 1982, they also won the Copa de Oro in 1981, the Copa Libertadores in 1982, and the 1982 Intercontinental Cup.

In 1983 Fernando Morena joined Brazilian soccer team Flamengo and in 1984 he played for Boca Juniors of Argentina. He finished his professional career in Peñarol in 1985.

International career
Fernando made his debut for the Uruguay national team on 27 October 1971 against Chile in a 3–0 win, where he scored his first goal. He was part of the national team that represented Uruguay at the 1974 World Cup. He went on to obtain a total number of 54 international caps, scoring 22 goals which currently ranks him as the joint eighth-highest scorer in the history of the team. On September 4, 1983, Morena suffered a tibia and fibula fracture when playing Venezuela for the Copa America. He never played for the national team after that incident, though he is still officially considered a part of the Uruguayan team that won the Copa América in 1983.

Coaching career
After retiring, he held several coaching positions in Uruguay, Spain and Chile. His first coaching job was in River Plate, which was followed by Peñarol, Real Murcia in Spain, Huracán Buceo, Rampla Juniors, Colo Colo in Chile and a second run in Peñarol in 2005. In 2009, he was designated as Manager of Institutional Relations at Peñarol.

Career statistics

International

Honours

Club
Peñarol
Uruguayan Primera División (6): 1973, 1974, 1975, 1978, 1981, 1982
Copa Libertadores: 1982
Intercontinental Cup: 1982

Valencia
European Super Cup: 1980

International
Uruguay
Copa América: 1983

Individual
Uruguayan Primera División top scorer (7): 1973, 1974, 1975, 1976, 1977, 1978, 1982
Copa Libertadores top scorer: 1974, 1975, 1982

Records
He scored 230 goals in Uruguayan championships making him the highest scoring player in the history of Uruguayan league football. He scored a total of 268 goals throughout his football career.
He holds the Uruguayan domestic record for the most goals scored in a game with 7 goals against Huracán Buceo, it could have been 8 but he missed a penalty in the final minutes of the game.
He is the highest goalscorer in a Uruguayan Primera league season with 36 goals in 1978.
Three times top scorer in the Copa Libertadores (1974, 1975 and 1982).
Highest scoring Uruguayan player in the history of the Copa Libertadores with 37 goals in 77 games.

References

External links

Profile 
Daily El Observador. - Referi - España - Morena fue homenajeado en Valencia. - Montevideo, 3 de agosto de 2011.

1952 births
Living people
Uruguayan footballers
Uruguayan expatriate footballers
Association football forwards
Footballers from Montevideo
Uruguay international footballers
1974 FIFA World Cup players
1983 Copa América players
Uruguayan Primera División players
Racing Club de Montevideo players
Club Atlético River Plate (Montevideo) players
Peñarol players
La Liga players
Rayo Vallecano players
Valencia CF players
CR Flamengo footballers
Boca Juniors footballers
Argentine Primera División players
Expatriate footballers in Argentina
Expatriate footballers in Brazil
Expatriate footballers in Spain
Uruguayan expatriate sportspeople in Argentina
Uruguayan expatriate sportspeople in Brazil
Uruguayan expatriate sportspeople in Spain
Uruguayan football managers
River Plate Montevideo managers
Peñarol managers
Colo-Colo managers
Real Murcia managers
Rampla Juniors managers
Expatriate football managers in Chile
Copa América-winning players
Copa Libertadores-winning players